Leokaneng is a large village in Moletši in the Blouberg Local Municipality of the Capricorn District Municipality of the Limpopo province of South Africa. It is located 64 km northwest of Polokwane and 39 km southeast of Senwabarwana.

Education 
Mašiane High School.
Leokaneng Primary School.

There is no institution of higher learning in Leokaneng. The majority of 
successful matriculants opt for the University of Limpopo's Turfloop
Campus to further their studies, while others opt for universities based
in Gauteng.

Sports  
Football (Soccer) is the most popular sport in Leokaneng.
There are three football clubs, which are:
Leokaneng Chiefs F.C.
Stone F.C.

Netball is most popular among teenage girls and young women. However, currently the netball teams in the village are defunct. It is not clear as to what exactly led to this occurrence.

References 

Populated places in the Blouberg Local Municipality